Kayko and Kokosh (Polish: Kajko i Kokosz) is a Polish-language animated series based on the comic series Kajko and Kokosz by Janusz Christa. The series was developed by EGoFILM studio and is the first Polish animated Netflix original series. It premiered on 28 February 2021, and since 1 December same year the series has been distributed worldwide. All episodes were written by Maciej Kur, who is also the writer of the newest volumes of the Kajko and Kokosz comic book series, and Rafał Skarżycki. Directors include comic book author Michał Śledziński.

Cast 
 Artur Pontek as Kayko
 Michał Piela as Kokosh
 Jarosław Boberek as Mirmił, a castellan of the settlement
 Agata Kulesza as Jaga, Kokosh's aunt
 Jan Aleksandrowicz-Krasko as Łamignat, Jaga's husband and a nice, lovable thief 
 Grzegorz Pawlak as Hegemon, leader of the Knaveknights and the main villain of the series
 Anna Apostolakis as Lubawa, Mirmił's wife
 Jacek Kopczyński as Corporal, Hegemon's right hand man
 Abelard Giza as Oferma
 Krzysztof Zalewski as Wit, the rhyming knight  
 Mateusz Łasowski as Siłacz
 Eryk Lubos as Rodrus, smug warrior
 Maciej Kosmala as Miluś, Kayko and Kokosh's dragon
 Anna Cieślak as Mgiełka (Misty), the kind, young priestess of Porevit 
 Monika Brodka as Kaprilda, a spoiled, rich princess
 Olaf Lubaszenko as Ramparam, Kaprilda's devoted father
 Jerzy Stuhr as Old man of the forest, an mythological character who rules over the woods

References

External links

 

Polish children's television series
Polish children's animated television series
Polish-language Netflix original programming
2021 Polish television series debuts
Television shows based on comics